Kashinskoye is a rural locality (a village) in Kalininskoye Rural Settlement, Totemsky District, Vologda Oblast, Russia. The population was 14 as of 2002.

Geography 
Kashinskoye is located 30 km southwest of Totma (the district's administrative centre) by road. Tabory is the nearest rural locality.

References 

Rural localities in Tarnogsky District